Hoist The King (1978 –  1995) was an American Thoroughbred racehorse who sold for a record-setting $1.6 million ($ million inflation adjusted) as a yearling in 1979. He proved to be of little use as a racehorse, failing to win in nine races. He later stood as a breeding stallion in Japan with little success.

Background
Hoist The King was a  bay horse bred in Kentucky by Tom Gentry. His dam, Royal Dowry was a half-sister to Dear April whose descendants have included Bahri and Ajina. Before foaling Hoist The King, Royal Dowry had already produced the Frizette Stakes winner Tudor Queen and the Las Palmas Handicap winner Chargers Star. Hoist The King was sired by Hoist the Flag, the American Champion Two-Year-Old Colt of his generation whose other progeny included the dual Prix de l'Arc de Triomphe winner Alleged.

At the 1979 Keeneland July Sales he was bought for a then world-record price of $1.6 million by the late John Corbett of Heron Bloodstock Services acting as agent for Kazuo Nakamura who outbid the British Bloodstock Agency's Joss Collins who was bidding on behalf of the English owner, Robert Sangster. When the gavel fell, the consignor, Tom Gentry, rushed over to the successful Japanese owner and gave him the multi-coloured 'trademark' jacket that he was wearing. Mr. Nakamura declared that he was going to name his new acquisition  "Ichi-ban".

Racing career
Hoist the King spent his racing  career in California trained by J.T. (Tommy) Doyle, finishing second and third in his two races as a juvenile and running unplaced on his only appearance as a three-year-old. .

Stud record
Hoist the King was retired from racing to become a breeding stallion in Japan. He was not a success, siring twenty winners in thirteen covering seasons from 1983 to 1995.

Pedigree

References

1978 racehorse births
Racehorses trained in the United States
Racehorses bred in Kentucky
Thoroughbred family 13-c